Alfredo Ramos (born 15 February 1906, date of death unknown) was a Portuguese association footballer who played as a forward.

Football career 

Ramos gained four caps for Portugal, and made his debut on 1 April 1928 in Lisbon against Argentina, in a 0-0 draw. He was a non-playing member of Portugal's squad at the 1928 Olympic football tournament.

References

External links 
 
 

1906 births
Portuguese footballers
Association football forwards
C.F. Os Belenenses players
Portugal international footballers
Footballers at the 1928 Summer Olympics
Year of death missing
Olympic footballers of Portugal